Brian Landrus (born September 14, 1978) is a jazz saxophonist, multi-instrumentalist, composer, producer, and educator.

Career

Landrus was born in Reno, Nevada, where he began playing professionally at the age of 13. He earned a degree in saxophone performance at the University of Nevada, Reno. At the age of 18 he began performing on tenor and baritone saxophone with The Temptations, The Four Tops, The Coasters, The Drifters, and Martha Reeves. In 2003 he moved to Boston in to attend the New England Conservatory. After graduation in 2007 Landrus recorded his album Forward for Cadence Jazz Records.

He toured internationally with Esperanza Spalding.

Landrus is an Associate Professor of Jazz Composition at Berklee College of Music

Education
 Bachelor's Degree in Saxophone Performance, University of Nevada Reno, 2002
 Master of Music Degree in Jazz Saxophone, New England Conservatory,  2007
 Master of Music Degree in Jazz Composition, New England Conservatory, 2007
 PhD in Music Composition, Rutgers University, 2019

Main source:

Awards
 Rising star, miscellaneous instruments (bass clarinet), in DownBeat magazine's Critics' Poll in 2021
 Rising star, baritone saxophone, in DownBeat magazine's Critics' Poll in 2015

Praise for Brian Landus
The Boston Globe reviewer of his 2011 album Capsule wrote that the album, "which includes pianist Michael Cain (mostly on Fender Rhodes), guitar Nir Felder, bassist Matthew Parish, and drummer Rudy Royston, makes an organic fusion that ignores the boundaries that supposedly separate jazz, rock, pop, and R&B". His 2015 album The Deep Below was described by The New York Times as "a sonic register: low and deep, Mr. Landrus's natural range on baritone saxophone, bass saxophone, bass flute and bass clarinet".

Discography

As leader 
 Red List (Palmetto, 2022)
 For Now (BlueLand, 2020)
 Generations (BlueLand, 2017)
 The Deep Below(Palmetto/BlueLand, 2015)
 Mirage (BlueLand, 2013)
 Capsule (BlueLand, 2011)
 Traverse (BlueLand, 2010)
 Everlasting (CIMP, 2009)
 Forward (Cadence Jazz, 2008)

As sideman
 Ken Schaphorst, How to Say Goodbye (JCA)
 Nicholas Urie, My Garden (Red Piano)
Main source:

References

1978 births
Living people
Jazz baritone saxophonists
American jazz saxophonists
American male saxophonists
Bass clarinetists
American jazz flautists
American jazz composers
American male jazz composers
American multi-instrumentalists
American jazz bass clarinetists
21st-century American saxophonists
21st-century clarinetists
21st-century American male musicians
21st-century multi-instrumentalists
The Delphian Jazz Orchestra members
21st-century flautists